Trollkins is a 1981 animated series produced by Hanna-Barbera Productions that aired for one season on CBS. Essentially a cross between The Smurfs (which incidentally premiered the same day, September 12, 1981, in the same time slot at 8:30 ET) and The Dukes of Hazzard, it followed the misadventures of trolls Blitz, Pixlee, and Flooky.

Plot
The Trollkins are a race of small trolls with green, blue, and purple faces who live in a tree community called Trolltown. The episodes follow the adventures of Blitz (voiced by Steve J. Spears), Pixlee (voiced by Jennifer Darling), and their pet companion Flooky (voiced by Frank Welker). Blitz's father Mayor Lumpkin (voiced by Paul Winchell) was somewhat of a short, incompetent, hot-headed, fumble-mouth of a mayor who spoke in spoonerisms. Pixlee's father Sheriff Trollsom (voiced by Alan Oppenheimer), more mild-mannered than Mayor Lumpkin, and his two deputies Dotty and Flake (voiced by Jennifer Darling and Marshall Efron) were just as incompetent and fumble-minded in maintaining order in Trolltown. Nevertheless, there was no complete love lost amongst the citizens of Trolltown despite the continuous escapades, including those involving a renegade motorcycle gang known as the Troll Choppers (much like the Chopper Bunch from Wheelie and the Chopper Bunch) who terrorized the citizens of Trolltown from time to time, but were merely a nuisance rather than a threat to everyone.

Cast

 Michael Bell as Grubb Trollmaine
 Bill Callaway as Slug
 Jennifer Darling as Pixlee Trollsom, Deputroll Dotty
 Marshall Efron as Deputroll Flake
 Alan Oppenheimer as Sheriff Pudge Trollsom
 Hank Saroyan as Afid
 Steve Spears as Blitz
 Frank Welker as Bogg, Flooky, Top Troll
 Paul Winchell as Mayor Lumpkin

Additional voices

 Jared Barclay
 Mel Blanc
 Scatman Crothers
 Peter Cullen
 Billie Hayes
 Ken Mars
 Don Messick
 Robert Allen Ogle
 Bob Sarlatte
 Marilyn Schreffler
 Rick Segall
 Hal Smith
 John Stephenson
 Lennie Weinrib
 Alan Young

Episodes

Broadcast history
 September 12, 1981 – September 4, 1982 – CBS
 1985–91 – USA Cartoon Express
 1992–2001 – Cartoon Network
 April 1, 2000–10 – Boomerang (on occasions)

References

External links
 Trollkins at Internet Movie Database

Fictional trolls
1980s American animated television series
1981 American television series debuts
1982 American television series endings
American children's animated comedy television series
American children's animated fantasy television series
CBS original programming
English-language television shows
Television series by Hanna-Barbera